Hystrichopsylla is a genus of insects belonging to the family Hystrichopsyllidae.

The species of this genus are found in Europe and Northern America.

Species:
 Hystrichopsylla cryptotis Acosta & Morrone, 2005
 Hystrichopsylla dippiei Rothschild, 1902
 Hystrichopsylla schefferi Chapin, 1919

References

Hystrichopsyllidae
Siphonaptera genera